Band 4.1-like protein 1 is a protein that in humans is encoded by the EPB41L1 gene.

Function 

Erythrocyte membrane protein band 4.1 (EPB41) is a multifunctional protein that mediates interactions between the erythrocyte cytoskeleton and the overlying plasma membrane. The protein encoded by this gene is a neuronally-enriched protein that is structurally similar to EPB41. The encoded protein binds and stabilizes D2 and D3 dopamine receptors at the neuronal plasma membrane. Multiple transcript variants encoding different isoforms have been found for this gene, but the full-length nature of only two of them has been determined.

Interactions 

EPB41L1 has been shown to interact with:
 CENTG1, 
 Dopamine receptor D2, 
 Dopamine receptor D3, 
 ITPR1,  and
 Nuclear mitotic apparatus protein 1.

References

Further reading